XHCJU-FM is a radio station on 95.9 FM in Jarretaderas, Nayarit, Mexico, primarily serving Puerto Vallarta, with a grupera format under the Ke Buena name.

History
Luis Carlos Mendiola Codina received this station's original concession on April 3, 1995 as XECJU-AM 590, to be located at Cruz de Huanacaxtle, and signing on July 11, 1996. It added an FM signal in 2011. The station's tower is located less than a mile from the Nayarit-Jalisco state line.

XHCJU attempted an unauthorized move to 96.7 MHz, from a transmitter on the Jalisco side of the state line, in 2013. The frequency change, which was conducted because of interference from XHME-FM and XHVAY-FM, produced interference to air traffic services operating at 119 MHz and prompted federal authorities to open a proceeding that could have revoked the station's concession.

In 2015, XHCJU ditched its own grupera format in favor of adopting the Ke Buena brand from Televisa Radio. It had previously aired MVS Radio's La Mejor grupera format.

In 2017, XHCJU-FM was sold to GlobalMedia of San Luis Potosí. The concession transfer to a GlobalMedia subsidiary, New Digital NX, did not take place for nearly two years after the sale.

References

Radio stations in Nayarit